Carole Rosser (born 20 April 1942) is a British former tennis player.

A native of Devon, Rosser was active in the 1960s. Her tournaments wins include singles titles at the South of England Championships in 1962 and Welsh Championships in 1963. She was a three-time winner of the Scottish Hard Court Championships. In 1964 she had an upset win over Lesley Turner at a tournament in Lausanne. She and Virginia Wade teamed up to make the doubles quarter-finals of the 1964 U.S. National Championships.

Rosser married Scottish tennis player Harry Matheson and their son is former professional player Ross Matheson.

References

1942 births
Living people
British female tennis players
English female tennis players
Tennis people from Devon